The 2007 Yale Bulldogs football team represented Yale University in the 2007 NCAA Division I FCS football season.  The Bulldogs were led by 11th-year head coach Jack Siedlecki, played their home games at the Yale Bowl and finished in second place in the Ivy League with a 6–1 record, 9–1 overall. Yale averaged 22,792 fans per game..

Schedule

References

Yale
Yale Bulldogs football seasons
Yale Bulldogs football